Patrick Liniger (born 18 August 1971) is a Swiss former footballer who played in the late 1980s, the 1990s and the 2000s as defender.

Liniger played his youth football with FC Basel and advanced to their first team for their 1988–89 season and signed his first professional football contract under head coach Urs Siegenthaler. After playing in two test games, Liniger played his domestic league debut for the club in the home game at the St. Jakob Stadium on 11 March 1990 as Basel won 3–1 against Schaffhausen.

He stayed with the club for three years and during this time Liniger played a total of 25 games for Basel without scoring a goal. 16 of these games were in the Nationalliga B, one in the Swiss Cup and eight were friendly games.

After his time with Basel, Liniger moved on and played for various local teams and became coach. Towards the end of his playing career Liniger played for SC Binningen in the Swiss Cup against his club of origin on 20 October 2007. Basel advanced to the next round winning 6–1.

References

Sources
 Die ersten 125 Jahre. Publisher: Josef Zindel im Friedrich Reinhardt Verlag, Basel. 
 Verein "Basler Fussballarchiv" Homepage

FC Basel players
SV Muttenz players
SC Binningen players
Swiss men's footballers
Association football defenders
1971 births
Living people
Swiss Challenge League players